Psycho Therapy may refer to:

Psychotherapy, or personal counseling with a psychotherapist
Psycho Therapy (The Soundtrack), a 2007 hip hop album by Psycho Les of The Beatnuts
"Psycho Therapy", a song on The Ramones' 1983 punk rock album Subterranean Jungle